Dryophytes eximius, commonly known as the mountain tree frog, is a species of frog in the family Hylidae endemic to Mexico. Its natural habitats are mesquite grasslands, scrub forests, and pine-oak forests. It is a widely distributed species that faces no major threats.

Dryophytes eximius is listed as the state amphibian of Arizona. As currently circumscribed, Dryophytes eximius does not occur in Arizona. Dryophytes wrightorum, the Wright's mountain tree frog, which has previously been regarded as a synonym of Dryophytes eximius does occur in Arizona.

References

Dryophytes
Amphibians described in 1854
Endemic amphibians of Mexico
Taxonomy articles created by Polbot